Kamora is a brand of coffee liqueur produced in Mexico.  It is slightly less sweet, and also less expensive than its main competitor Kahlúa. It is 20% alcohol by volume (40 proof). Formerly owned by Beam Suntory, the brand was sold to Phillips in 2021.

References

Mexican alcoholic drinks
Coffee liqueurs
Beam Suntory
Mexican brands